Kristoffer Gunnarsson Matsson (born 26 February 1997) is a Swedish professional ice hockey defenseman who is currently playing with Mora IK of the HockeyAllsvenskan (Allsv). He was selected by the Vancouver Canucks in the fifth round, 135th overall, of the 2017 NHL Entry Draft.

Playing career
Gunnarsson played junior hockey with Swedish team Frölunda HC. In 2012 Gunnarsson competed with a regional all-star team from Västergötland in the annual TV-pucken, an under-15 national tournament, and notched one assists over eight games. After impressive performances in the J20 SuperElit, Gunnarsson played 13 games in Sweden's top-flight SHL.

During the 2018–19 season, Gunnarsson recorded 1 goal in 15 games from the blueline with Frölunda before he was loaned to fellow SHL club, Linköpings HC, for the remainder of the season on 3 December 2018.

On 15 May 2019, Gunnersson left the SHL to sign a two-year contract with Mora IK of the HockeyAllsvenskan.

Career statistics

Regular season and playoffs

International

Awards and honors

References

External links

1997 births
Living people
Frölunda HC players
Kristianstads IK players
Linköping HC players
Mora IK players
IK Oskarshamn players
People from Borås
Swedish ice hockey defencemen
Vancouver Canucks draft picks
Sportspeople from Västra Götaland County